Ralph Pfeifer (born c. 1936) is a former Canadian football player who played for the Edmonton Eskimos. He played college football at Kansas State University.

References

1930s births
Living people
American football halfbacks
Canadian football running backs
Kansas State Wildcats football players
Edmonton Elks players